Mehrali bey Javanshir — was the de facto leader of the Karabakh Khanate prior to Ibrahim Khalil Khan's arrival from Zand Iran. Most of the information about him came from his descendant Ahmad bey Javanshir's On the Political Affairs of the Karabakh khanate in 1747–1805.

Life 
He commanded a wing of 3,000 soldiers during Muhammadhasan khan's invasion of Karabakh in 1757. He was left behind by his father Panah Ali Khan prior to his departure to Iran in 1759. Not accepting Ibrahim Khalil's right to rule, he established several alliances with nomadic tribes in Karabakh. However, he was defeated by the combined forces of his brother and the Avar khanate and had to flee to Karim Khan Zand, who instructed Hedayat-Allah Khan of Gilan to invade Karabakh. However Karim Khan's death in 1779 foiled the plans of Mehrali. This time he left for the Quba Khanate and obtained an alliance with Fatali Khan who was going to invade the Karabakh Khanate in 1785. However Mehrali bey was ambushed on his way from Baku to Karabakh by the forces of Aghasi Khan of Shirvan.

Family 
He had at least four sons and a daughter:

 Muhammad bey (1762-1797)
 Jafarqoli bey
 Ahmad bey Javanshir
 Alihumbat bey
 Asadullah bey
 Khankishi bey
 Khankhanum agha — married to Mehdigulu Khan Javanshir
 Khadija begüm — married to Muhammad Qasim agha, son of Ibrahim Khalil Khan.

References 

Karabakh Khanate
Azerbaijani nobility
People from Karabakh
1735 births
1785 deaths
Ethnic Afshar people
Khans of Karabakh